Sysolsky District (Syktyv rajon) is an administrative district (raion), one of the twelve in the Komi Republic, Russia. It is located in the south of the republic. Its administrative center is the rural locality (a selo) of Vizinga. As of the 2010 Census, the total population of the district was 13,956, with the population of Vizinga accounting for 48.8% of that number.

Administrative and municipal status
Within the framework of administrative divisions, Sysolsky District is one of the twelve in the Komi Republic. The district is divided into nine selo administrative territories and two settlement administrative territories, which comprise seventy-nine rural localities. As a municipal division, the district is incorporated as Sysolsky Municipal District. Its eleven administrative territories are incorporated as eleven rural settlements within the municipal district. The selo of Vizinga serves as the administrative center of both the administrative and municipal district.

References

Notes

Sources

Districts of the Komi Republic
